George Ireland (June 15, 1913 – September 14, 2001) was an American basketball coach who led the Loyola Ramblers to the 1963 NCAA championship.

Background
Born in Madison, Wisconsin, Ireland was an All-American basketball player at the University of Notre Dame during the 1930s.  His first coaching job was at Marmion Academy in Aurora, Illinois, which he led to 262–87 record from 1936 to 1951.  In 1951, he succeeded John Jordan, a former teammate at Notre Dame, as head coach at Loyola University Chicago, and he remained at Loyola until 1975.  Ireland encouraged full-court press and a high-speed style of play. In 1962, he became the first coach of a major NCAA program to use five African American players in a game at the same time. (This was particularly notable at the time, as some schools refused to play against a team with even one black player.)

1963 championship

The highlight of Ireland's coaching career occurred in 1963, when he guided the Loyola Ramblers to the national collegiate championship. Ireland's team, led by Jerry Harkness and Les Hunter, compiled a 23–2 regular season record and finished first in the country in scoring. They defeated Tennessee Tech 111–42 in the first round of the NCAA tournament (still the largest margin of victory in an NCAA tournament game), and after victories over Mississippi State, Illinois and Duke, the Ramblers reached the finals, where they faced two-time defending champion Cincinnati. Loyola trailed Cincinnati by 15 points with 10 minutes left in the game, but the Ramblers rallied to force an overtime session, winning the game 60–58 with a last-second tip-in by Vic Rouse.  Loyola remains the only school in Illinois to have won an NCAA Division I basketball championship. The 1963 Loyola team also broke racial barriers by being the first NCAA Division I team to have four African-American players in the everyday lineup.

On July 11, 2013, surviving members of Loyola's team were honored by President Barack Obama at the White House to celebrate the 50th anniversary of the school's championship. Ireland was represented at the Oval Office ceremony by his daughter, Judy van Dyck, and by Loyola's current head coach, Porter Moser.

Later career
Under Ireland, the Loyola Ramblers returned to the NCAA tournament in 1964, 1966, and 1968, although they never repeated the success of 1963. During the late 1960s and early 1970s, Ireland coached LaRue Martin, who became the first overall pick of the 1972 NBA draft. However, Martin's NBA career lasted just four seasons, prompting analysts to call him one of the biggest busts in NBA history. Ireland retired in January 1975, 14 games into the 1974–75 season, with a 321–255 record, good for a .557 winning percentage. He later worked as a volunteer coach for children with intellectual and developmental disabilities at the Center for Enriched Living in Skokie, Illinois. He led them to an undefeated inaugural season in 1979. On September 14, 2001, he died at the age of 88 in Addison, Illinois.

See also
 Black participation in college basketball
 List of NCAA Division I Men's Final Four appearances by coach

References

1913 births
2001 deaths
All-American college men's basketball players
American men's basketball coaches
American men's basketball players
Basketball coaches from Wisconsin
Basketball players from Wisconsin
High school basketball coaches in the United States
Loyola Ramblers athletic directors
Loyola Ramblers men's basketball coaches
Notre Dame Fighting Irish men's basketball players
People from Addison, Illinois
Sportspeople from Madison, Wisconsin